International Cooperative Day is an annual celebration of the cooperative movement observed on the first Saturday in July since 1923 by the International Cooperative Alliance. 

On December 16, 1992, the United Nations General Assembly proclaimed in resolution 47/90 "the first Saturday of July 1995 to be International Day of Cooperatives, marking the centenary of the establishment of the International Cooperative Alliance." Since 1995 the United Nations' International Day of Cooperatives has been observed jointly alongside International Cooperative Day.

Cooperatives around the world celebrate the day in various fashions and each year the organising institutions agree on a theme for the celebrations. The 2010 theme was Cooperative Enterprise Empowers Women, to coincide with the 15th anniversary of the Beijing Platform for Action.

Previous years' themes
2022 Cooperatives Build a Better World
2021: Rebuild better together
2020: Cooperatives For Climate Action
2019: COOPS 4 DECENT WORK
 2018: Sustainable consumption and production
 2017: Cooperatives ensure no one is left behind
 2016: Cooperatives: The power to act for a sustainable future.
 2015: Choose cooperatives, choose equality
 2014: Cooperative enterprises achieve sustainable development for all.
 2013: Cooperative enterprise remains strong in time of crisis.
 2012: Cooperative enterprises build a better world.
 2011: Youth, the future of co-operative enterprise
 2010: Cooperative Enterprise Empowers Women
 2009: Driving Recovery through Cooperative Enterprise
 2008: Confronting Climate Change through Cooperative Enterprise
 2007 Cooperative Values and Principles for Corporate Social responsibility
 2006 Peace-building through Cooperatives
 2005: Microfinance is OUR business! Cooperating out of poverty
 2004: Cooperatives for Fair Globalisation: Creating Opportunities for All
 2003: Cooperatives Make Development Happen!: The contribution of co-operatives to the United Nations Millennium Development Goals
 2002: Society and Cooperatives: Concern for Community
 2001: The Cooperative Advantage in the Third Millennium
 2000: Cooperatives and Employment Promotion
 1999: Public Policy and Cooperative Legislation
 1998: Cooperatives and the Globalization of the Economy
 1997: The Cooperative Contribution to World Food Security
 1996: Cooperative Enterprise: Empowerment for People-centred Sustainable Development
 1995: The ICA Centennial and the Next 100 Years of International Cooperation

References

External links
 ICA Day information from the International Co-operative Alliance
 IDC information from the Committee for the Promotion and Advancement of Cooperatives (COPAC)
 Information portal on the social economy in GREECE 

July observances
Recurring events established in 1923
United Nations days
International Co-operative Day
Holidays and observances by scheduling (nth weekday of the month)
Saturday observances